The Citroën Oli (pronounced “all-E”) is an all-electric pickup concept that was unveiled on September 29, 2022. Before that, it was announced through a teaser image on September 27, 2022, and it will introduce the brand's new identity and logo, which is a reinterpretation of the original from 1919.

The double chevron oval badge debuted on this concept and will be phased in on future production models starting from mid-2023.

Overview

Even though it won't spawn a production version, the French company says the "ideas, design details and interior advances" from this concept should appear on future production models.

References

External links
 Official website (United Kingdom)

Oli
Oli